Bob Malach (born August 23, 1954) is an American jazz saxophonist.

Malach learned several reed instruments in his youth, and played with Philadelphia soul bands such as The Stylistics and The O'Jays while still a teenager. He played in the big bands of Lin Biviano and Les Elgart in the mid-1970s, then moved to New York City in 1977, where he met Alphonse Mouzon. He recorded with Mouzon and went on tour with him in Europe, leading to eventual collaborations with European jazz artists including George Gruntz, Chris Hinze, Joachim Kuhn, Didier Lockwood, Palle Mikkelborg, Michel Petrucciani, Aldo Romano, Bo Stief, and Jasper Van't Hof.

In the US, Malach played extensively both in jazz circles and with pop, rock, and soul musicians. He worked with Stanley Clarke in the 1970s, and in the 1980s and 1990s played with, among others, Madonna, Horace Silver, Bob Mintzer, Robben Ford, Stevie Wonder, Steve Miller, Joe Zawinul, Mike Stern, Georgie Fame, Ben Sidran, Leni Stern, and Dave Weckl.

Discography
 Some People (MPS, 1980)
 Mood Swing (Go Jazz, 1990)
 Dinner for Two  with Jasper van 't Hof (MA Music, 1990)
 The Prague Concert with Jasper van 't Hof (P&J Music, 1992)
 The Searcher (Go Jazz, 1995)
 After Hours (Go Jazz, 1998)
 Conversations with Michel with Michel Petrucciani (Go Jazz, 2000)
 Pseudopodia with Jasper van 't Hof (In+Out, 2008)

As sideman
 Louis Bellson, Originals (Stash, 1980)
 George Gruntz, First Prize (Enja, 1989)
 Bill O'Connell, Latin Jazz Fantasy (Random Chance, 2004)

References
Mark Gilbert, "Bob Malach". The New Grove Dictionary of Jazz. 2nd edition, ed. Barry Kernfeld.

1954 births
American jazz saxophonists
American male saxophonists
Living people
Musicians from Philadelphia
21st-century American saxophonists
Jazz musicians from Pennsylvania
21st-century American male musicians
American male jazz musicians